Saints Simon and Jude serves the parish of Streatham Hill

History 

The  Catholic Community of Streatham Hill was founded in 1904 when Frances Elizabeth  Ellis of Clapham Park gave Bishop Peter Amigo, fourth Bishop of Southwark,  funds to build 12 churches in honour of the 12 apostles. Miss Ellis and her  sister had bought the land from the London, Brighton and South Coast Railway  Company. As in all the Ellis foundations, at Sts Simon and Jude there is a  monthly Mass 'For all who have ever worshipped in this church'.

The  church, designed by Clement Jackson, was opened in 1905 as the Tulse Hill  Mission and Father (later Canon) Rory Fletcher, a former surgeon at Charing  Cross Hospital, was appointed as the first Mission Priest.
  
The site of the Church was a cattle pond fed by a stream, which still  runs underneath the church. Almost  immediately, this stream was the cause of structural weakness, which has  continued to give subsidence problems over the years. In the entrance hall to the sacristy, you can see plans for additions to the church which were never built for this reason.

By  1985, the whole property was suffering from subsidence, and daylight could be  seen through many of the cracks in the walls of the church and house. An  extensive and expensive programme of underpinning and repair to the whole structure had to be undertaken as a matter of urgency. At the same time, it was  decided to start decorating the interior. The sanctuary was raised up one  metre and a new altar of Ancaster stone backed by an oak dossal and damask  hangings was installed. Cheshire sandstone was used for the Tabernacle pillar  and the pulpit base. The great Cross and two hand-carved angels which came  originally from Poland were gilded. A new Ahlborn electric organ was installed  at the side of the sanctuary: it has an extra computer which reads and stores what the organist is playing, which means that it can play itself when the organist is not present, a great help when there are multiple Masses on one day.  A programme to fill the windows  with stained glass was undertaken by the artist Andrew Taylor of Devizes in a  mediaeval style with the most recent addition of a central widow on the front of the Church with the image of the Divine Mercy. This is lit in the evening from inside the Church for the benefit of the local people. This window was designed and manufactured by Mrs Susan Ashworth of Blackheath, London. It was installed in 2004 to celebrate the Centenary of the building of the Church.

References

External links 
 Sts Simon and Jude website

Christian organizations established in 1904
Churches in the Diocese of Southwark
Roman Catholic churches in the London Borough of Lambeth